Susan H. Morgan (born September 1, 1949) is an American Republican politician who served in the Oregon House of Representatives from 1999 until 2009. She served later on the Douglas County Board of Commissioners.

Career
Morgan served on the South Umpqua Land Use Planning Advisory Committee from 1980 until 1998. She was elected to the Oregon House of Representatives in 1998, and served until 2009, representing southern Douglas County. Morgan was elected a Douglas County Commissioner in 2008, and was reelected in 2012. In 2015, she filed a lawsuit against Douglas County, arguing term limits on elected officials were unconstitutional. Some residents of the county started a recall effort against Morgan, but the proposal failed because they did not collect enough signatures by the deadline.

References

Living people
1949 births
Republican Party members of the Oregon House of Representatives
People from Nanaimo
County commissioners in Oregon
Women state legislators in Oregon
20th-century American politicians
21st-century American politicians
University of Oregon alumni
People from Myrtle Creek, Oregon
Lane Community College alumni
20th-century American women politicians
21st-century American women politicians